2,2,6,6-Tetramethylpiperidine, abbreviated TMP, HTMP, or TMPH, is an organic compound of the amine class. In appearance, it is a colorless liquid and has a "fishy", amine-like odor. This amine is used in chemistry as a hindered base (hindered amine).  Although TMP finds limited use per se, its derivatives are a mainstay of hindered amine light stabilizers.

TMP is the starting material for an even stronger base lithium tetramethylpiperidide and the radical species TEMPO. Another non-nucleophilic base is N,N-diisopropylethylamine.  Its aqueous pKaH (conjugate acid dissociation constant, a measure of basicity) is 11.07 at 25 °C, while its pKa (acid dissociation constant, a measure of acidity) is approximately 37.

Preparation 
Many routes for the synthesis of TMP have been reported. One method starts with a conjugate addition reaction of ammonia to phorone. The intermediate triacetone amine is then reduced in a Wolff-Kishner reaction.

See also
2,6-Dimethylpiperidine
Pempidine
TEMPO ((2,2,6,6-Tetramethylpiperidin-1-yl)oxyl)

References

External links
 DataSheet I
 DataSheet II
 TMP applied in synthesis in Organic Syntheses

Piperidines
Reagents for organic chemistry
Non-nucleophilic bases